Hell on Heels is the first studio album by American country girl group Pistol Annies. The group consists of Miranda Lambert, Ashley Monroe, and Angaleena Presley. They released their single, "Hell on Heels," in May 2011 and released their debut album on August 23, 2011.  Pistol Annies debuted at Number 1 on Billboard’s Country Album Chart with their introductory album, Hell On Heels. With more than 44,000 albums sold in the first week, with little to no promotion, the group landed at Number 5 on the Billboard 200 Chart. As of June 5, 2013, the album has sold 488,000 copies in the United States.

Critical reception

Review aggregate site Metacritic gave the album a score of 84/100, based on 9 reviews, earning the summary "Universal acclaim". Karlie Justus of Engine 145 gave the single a "thumbs up", with her review saying, "But beyond its cleverly delivered lyrics and well-framed production, the best part about this initial showcase is the clear intent that seems to drive both the song and the group behind its singers." It received four stars from Matt Bjorke of Roughstock, who thought that it had "sassiness and a spark". Rating it four stars out of five, Jessica Phillips of Country Weekly  praised the "sparse production, unabashedly country lyrics and strong rhythm sections". In addition, Rolling Stone listed the album at 29 of the "50 Best Albums of 2011".  As of December 2012, the album has sold 430,000 copies without one big radio hit.

Track listing

Personnel

Pistol Annies
 Miranda Lambert - lead vocals, background vocals
 Ashley Monroe - lead vocals, background vocals
 Angaleena Presley - lead vocals, background vocals

Additional Musicians
 Richard Bennett - guitar
 Matt Chamberlain - drums
 Fred Eltringham - drums
 Josh Grange - guitar
 Jay Joyce - guitar
 Stuart Mathis - guitar
 Russ Pahl - steel guitar
 Randy Scruggs - guitar
 Michael Webb - keyboards
 Glenn Worf - bass
 Mike Wrucke - guitar

Charts

Weekly charts

Year-end charts

Singles

Certifications

References

2011 debut albums
Pistol Annies albums
Columbia Records albums
Albums produced by Frank Liddell